St. Patrick's Institute of Science & Technology is a Pakistani vocational school, located in the Saddar neighborhood of Saddar Town in Karachi, Sindh.

History and administration
In 1963, Fr. Dalmatius Geurts and Fr. Jimmy deSouza made an analysis of the situation and a feasibility study and came to the conclusion that there was a big demand for skilled craftsmen in Pakistan. The final plan was for a school for metal work, auto mechanics, electro-technology, air conditioning & refrigeration, and carpentry.

Brother Norman Wray, a de La Salle brother, helped set up the school  and was associated with it for 15 years. Since 1980, the principal of the school has been Brother George Abeyratne. The school is owned by the Roman Catholic Archdiocese of Karachi.

Development
With more than 350 students, the majority of whom are Muslims, the school caters to Pakistan's growing industrial development which calls for more technicians. The school conducts regular, as well as short evening courses.

Students are admitted to regular courses after passing class eight examinations. The courses prepare students for the class ten examinations conducted by the Sindh Board of Technical Education as well as the Diploma of Associate Engineer examination.

Most of the people who want careers as technicians take evening and short courses. They often get jobs as electricians or as air-conditioning and refrigeration mechanics. The school's fees for the courses are not high and concessions are granted to all deserving students. A computer section was scheduled to open in 1990.

Since 2006, it has evolved into an institute of science and technology. Its standard of training is such that enables students to travel overseas for advanced education.

In 2008, 45 students of the Institute were employed by Indus Motor Company, the manufacturers of Toyota cars in Pakistan.

Principals
Fr. Dalmatius Geurts OFM 1965-66
Bro. Landislaus Majad FSC 1966-68
Bro. Athanesius Navarre FSC 1968-70
Bro. Joseph Perera FSC 1970-72
Bro. Lawrence Jayasinghe FSC 1972-75
Bro. George Abeyratne FSC 1975-91
Bro Stephen Swan FSC 1991-92
Bro. Norman Wray FSC 1992-93
Fr. John Baptist Todd OFM 1993-94
Constantine D'Souza 1994-98
George Noronha 1998-99
Marcus D'Sa 1999-2009
Clive Vaz 2009 -

See also

 Catholic Church in Pakistan
 Education in Karachi
 List of schools in Karachi

References

1966 establishments in Pakistan
Boys' schools in Pakistan
Educational institutions established in 1966
Catholic secondary schools in Pakistan
Schools in Karachi
Vocational education in Pakistan
Vocational schools
Catholic Church in Pakistan
Private schools in Pakistan